Mutavakkil (Mutal) Burhonov (Мутаваккил [Мутал] Бурҳонов/مۇتەۋەككىل [مۇتەل] بۇرحاناۋ); Bukhara,  – June 15, 2002) was a Soviet Uzbek composer. He is recognized as People's Artist of Uzbekistan. 

He composed numerous songs, including the Anthem of Uzbek SSR.

1916 births
2002 deaths
Uzbekistani composers
Soviet composers
Soviet male composers
National anthem writers
People from Bukhara
Recipients of the Order of Lenin
20th-century male musicians